Stephan Maceda Palla (born 15 May 1989) is a professional footballer who plays as a defender for Austrian Landesliga club ASK Voitsberg.

Born in Austria, Palla spent his youth and early career with Rapid Wien before joining Wolfsberg. He then spent a season in Thailand with Buriram United before returning to Austria.

At international level, he represented the youth teams of his birth country before switching to the Philippines, for whom he is eligible through his mother. He made his senior international debut in 2015.

Club career

Rapid Vienna
Palla began his career with SC Mauerbach and joined in the year 1998 to the Academy from SK Rapid Wien. In the season 2007/2008 trained with the first team from Rapid Vienna and gave his debut on 29 March 2008 against Wacker Innsbruck. In summer 2008 was announced he will play on loan by FC Lustenau, he was not contract with the cooperations club and joined to the reserve team from Rapid Wien in January 2009. On 15 January 2010 left SK Rapid Wien and signed for Slovakian club DAC Dunajská Streda.

Wolfsberg
In mid-May 2014, Palla moved to Wolfsberg, signing a two-year contract.

St. Pölten
In July 2018, Palla joined St. Pölten, signing a one-year contract with an option to extend.

Buriram United
In July 2019, Palla moved to Buriram United.

International career
Palla was born in Austria to a Hungarian father and a Filipino mother, Palla initially represented Austria and played over 20 games for the U-17 national team. In June 2013, German coach Michael Weiß has referred to Palla as an "interesting option" for the Philippines national team's defense. On 25 May 2015, Palla has received his first senior call for Philippines to compete at the 2018 FIFA World Cup qualifiers.
He made his debut for the Philippines in a 2-1 victory against Bahrain.

Honours
Rapid Wien
 Austrian Bundesliga: 2007–08
FC Trenkwalder Admira
 Austrian Football First League: 2010–11
Buriram United
 Thailand Champions Cup: 2019

References

External links
 
 
 

1989 births
Living people
People from Wien-Umgebung District
Citizens of the Philippines through descent
Filipino footballers
Filipino expatriate footballers
Philippines international footballers
Austrian footballers
Austria youth international footballers
Austrian people of Filipino descent
SK Rapid Wien players
Wolfsberger AC players
Austrian Football Bundesliga players
FC Lustenau players
FC DAC 1904 Dunajská Streda players
Slovak Super Liga players
Expatriate footballers in Slovakia
Austrian expatriate sportspeople in Slovakia
Expatriate footballers in Thailand
Filipino expatriate sportspeople in Thailand
Association football fullbacks
2019 AFC Asian Cup players
Footballers from Lower Austria